Terminalia arjuna is a tree of the genus Terminalia. It is commonly known as arjuna or arjun tree in English.

Description
T. arjuna grows to about 20–25 metres tall; usually has a buttressed trunk, and forms a wide canopy at the crown, from which branches drop downwards. It has oblong, conical leaves which are green on the top and brown below; smooth, grey bark; it has pale yellow flowers which appear between March and June; its glabrous, 2.5 to 5 cm fibrous woody fruit, divided into five wings, appears between September and November.

The tree does not suffer from any major diseases or pests, but it is susceptible to Phyllactinia terminale and rot due to polystictus affinis.

Distribution and habitat
The arjuna is seen across the Indian Subcontinent, and usually found growing on river banks or near dry river beds in Uttar Pradesh, Bihar, Maharashtra, Madhya Pradesh, West Bengal, Odisha and south and central India, along with Sri Lanka and Bangladesh. 
It has also been planted in Malaysia, Indonesia and Kenya.

Importance

Silk production
The arjuna is one of the species whose leaves are fed on by the Antheraea paphia moth which produces the tassar silk, a wild silk of commercial importance.

Gallery

References

	

arjuna
Plants used in Ayurveda
Flora of the Indian subcontinent